Kalenjin may refer to:

 Kalenjin people of Kenya
 Elgeyo people (Keiyo people)
 Kipsigis people
 Marakwet people
 Nandi people
 Pokot people
 Terik people 
 Tugen people
 Sebei people 
 Kalenjin language
 Kalenjin languages

See also

 

Language and nationality disambiguation pages